The 1902 Michigan gubernatorial election was held on November 4, 1902. Incumbent Republican Aaron T. Bliss defeated Democratic candidate Lorenzo T. Durand with 52.52% of the vote.

Nominations

Republican Party nomination
Incumbent Governor Aaron T. Bliss was re-nominated with the first ballot at the 1902 Republican convention on June 26 in Detroit. Bliss received 811 votes on the ballot and Justus Smith Stearns received 214. Another 62 votes were split among candidates named Horton and Patton. They received 40 and 22 votes respectively.

Democratic Party nomination
Initially, during the 1902 Michigan Democratic Convention on July 31 in Detroit, George H. Durand was nominated for the gubernatorial election. Former congressman Timothy E. Tarsney was the first to nominate him. The convention was divided by the issue of bimetallism, with some Democrats supporting the policy of free silver, and some supporting the use of the gold standard. Durand supported the gold standard, but was eventually agreed upon between the factions. After four ballots, Durand was unanimously nominated by the convention, with the leader of the free silver faction, State Senator James W. Helme Jr. who had competed with Durand for nomination, throwing his support behind Durand as well. Durand was not present at the convention, and had been removed from political life for around six years at the time of his nomination. Durand would go on to accept the nomination. The platform adopted by the convention focused on state issues, and criticized the Republican controlled state administration for perceived corruption and incompetency.

In early September, Durand suffered a paralyzing stroke due to a cerebral embolism. Though he initially planned to continue his gubernatorial run, by September 25, Durand's health forced him to withdraw his candidacy. Bimetallism continued to be a dividing issue in seeking a new candidate for governor. The silver faction of the party wanted to reconvene the convention to decide on another nominee, but the gold faction wanted to have the Democratic state central committee to vote on a replacement. On September 30, after three hours of debate, the committee voted to fill the vacancy. Lorenzo T. Durand, the brother of George and fellow advocate of the gold standard, was selected with 14 votes on the second formal ballot. Charles R. Sligh, representing the silver faction of the party, got 10 votes on that ballot. Lorenzo's nomination was made unanimous with a third ballot.

Prohibitionist Party nomination
On August 8, Walter S. Westerman of Adrain was nominated by the 1902 Prohibitionist state convention in Detroit.

Socialist Party nomination
On March 1, the Socialist  state convention in Flint had an attendance of nine delegates. William E. Walter of Detroit was nominated for governor.

General election

Candidates
Major party candidates
Aaron T. Bliss, Republican
Lorenzo T. Durand, Democratic
Other candidates
Walter S. Westerman, Prohibition
William E. Walter, Socialist
Shepard B. Cowles, Socialist Labor

Results

References

1902
Michigan
Gubernatorial
November 1902 events